Chronicle: Volume Two, also known by the title including its subtitle as Chronicle: Volume Two - Twenty Great CCR Classics, is a compilation album by Creedence Clearwater Revival, released by Fantasy Records in November 1986. The collection follows Chronicle: The 20 Greatest Hits (1976), which includes all of the CCR's charted hits and remains the band's best-selling album.

The LP version of Chronicle: Volume Two contains an edited version of "Molina", removing the final saxophone solo.

Track listing

Personnel
''Per liner notes
John Fogerty – lead guitar, vocals, producer, arranger
Tom Fogerty – guitar, except on tracks 19 and 20
Stu Cook – bass
Doug Clifford – drums
Gary Hobish – digital mastering
Phil Carroll – art direction, design
Dieter Zill – photography

References

1986 greatest hits albums
Creedence Clearwater Revival compilation albums
Fantasy Records compilation albums
Albums produced by John Fogerty
Albums produced by Doug Clifford
Sequel albums